Andrey Leonidovich Shirman (born 23 May 1982), better known by his stage name DJ Smash, is a Russian DJ in house music and electronic music, and also a music producer. As of 2022, he is one of the most popular musical stars in Russia.  DJ Smash, or simply Smash was awarded Best New Act in 2008 at the MTV Russia Music Awards.

Biography 

DJ Smash was born in 1982 in Perm, Russia, and started making music at an early age. In 2006 he released the single "Moscow Never Sleeps", which became a hit, and brought him to wide attention. In 2008 at MTV Russian Music Awards, DJ Smash received nominations for “Debut of the Year” and “Best Dance Album”. 

During the 2018 presidential elections, he became a member of the Putin Team movement, which supported Vladimir Putin, and became the author of the "Guiding Star" anthem.   

Every year from 2007, Smash has produced several hit songs, including collaborations with other artists, which have enjoyed popularity across Russia, former Soviet Union countries, and beyond.

Discography

Studio albums 
 2008 — «IDDQD»
 2011 — «Twenty Three» 
 2012 — «Новый мир» (New world)
 2014 — «Star Tracks»
 2017 — «SmashWorld»

Singles 
2007 — Moscow Never Sleeps (feat. Fast Food)
2008 — Moscow Never Sleeps (feat. Timati & Fast Food)
2008 — Волна (Wave) (vocals: Lyudmila Sokolova)
2009 — Moscow Wait For February
2009 — The Best Song
2009 — Between The Earth And The Sky (feat. Shahzoda)
2010 — Airplane (feat. Fast Food)
2010 — Птица (Bird)
2010 — From Russia With Love
2011 — Without Words
2011 — Tricks (feat. Timati)
2011 — Rendez-vous (feat. Mauri)
2011 — Lifemission (feat. ChinKong)
2012 — Moscow (feat. Vintage)
2012 — Young Hearts
2012 — Jump (feat. T-Moor Rodriguez)
2012 — Long Distance Love (feat. Vera Brezhneva)
2012 — Only Forward (feat. DJ Vengerov)
2013 — New World (feat. Natalia Podolskaya)
2013 — Good Time (feat. Craig David)
2013 — Stop the Time
2013 — 3 Wishes (feat. Vintage)
2014 — BREAK IT (feat. Ch.Armstrong)
2014 — Rapture
2014 — The Edge (feat. Levingstone)
2014 — The Renegades (feat. Tara McDonald)
2015 — The Night Is Young (feat. Ridley)
2015 — Lovers 2 Lovers (feat. Ridley)
2016 — Dark Alleys (feat. Moya Michelle)
2020 — Begi (feat. Royot)
2020 — Puding (feat. NE Grishkovets)
2020 — Vesna u okna (feat. NE Grishkovets)
2021 — New Wave (with Morgenshtern)
2021 — Po Mozgam (feat. Royot and T-Fest)
2021 — Tikhi Gimn (feat. Karna.val)
2022 — ATML (feat. Royot)

Video clips 
 2007 — Moscow Never Sleeps (feat. Fast Food)
 2008 — Moscow Never Sleeps (feat. Timati & Fast Food)
 2008 — Pasha — Face Control (feat. Diskoteka Avariya)
 2008 — Волна (Wave) (vocals: Lyudmila Sokolova)
 2010 — The Best Song
 2010 — Between The Earth And The Sky (feat. Shahzoda)
 2011 — Airplane
 2011 — Tricks (feat. Timati & Fast Food)
 2012 — From Russia With Love
 2012 — Птица (Bird)
 2012 — Rendez-Vous (feat. Mauri)
 2012 — Without Words
 2012 — Na Zare (feat. Aleksey Rizhov & ChinKong & DJ Abssent)
 2012 — Moscow (feat. Vintage)
 2012 — Young Hearts
 2012 — Saturday (feat. MMDANCE)
 2012 — Jump (feat. T-Moor Rodriguez)
 2012 — Long Distance Love (feat. Vera Brezhneva)
 2012 — Only Forward (feat. DJ Vengerov)
 2013 — Откат (feat. Семён Слепаков)
 2013 — Angels (feat. DJ Miller & Anya)
 2013 — New World (feat. Natalia Podolskaya)
 2013 — Oil (feat. Vengerov & Bobina feat. Matuya & Averin & Kravets
 2013 — Stop The Time
 2013 — 3 Wishes (feat. Vintage)
 2014 — Break It (feat. Charlie Armstrong)
 2014 — Rapture
 2014 — The Edge
 2015 — The Night Is Young (feat. Ridley)
 2015 — Lovers 2 Lovers (feat. Ridley)
 2016 — Dark Alleys (feat. Moya Michelle)
 2017 — Команда 2018 (feat. Polina Gagarina & Egor Kreed)

Awards 

 2008 — Golden Gramophone Award

References

External links 
 Official site

1982 births
Living people
Musicians from Perm, Russia
Russian DJs
Russian record producers
21st-century Russian musicians